The Connaught Cemetery is a cemetery located in the Somme region of France commemorating British and Commonwealth soldiers who fought in the Battle of the Somme in World War I. The cemetery contains mainly those who died near the village of Thiepval from Autumn 1916 until the end of the war in November 1918 with a brief exception between March and August 1918.

Location 
The cemetery is located approximately 1 kilometer along the D73 road out of Thiepval, which is approximately 8 kilometers northeast of Albert, France. Geographically, it is located at the edge of Thiepval Wood near a formation known as Ulster Tower. Nearby is the Mill Road Cemetery, also from World War I.

Statistics 

There are now 1,268 Commonwealth soldiers buried in the cemetery, of which 646 are identified. All of the identified casualties are British.

References 

World War I cemeteries in France
Cemeteries in Somme (department)
1916 establishments in France
Battle of the Somme
Commonwealth War Graves Commission cemeteries in France